Joseph Hiester (November 18, 1752June 10, 1832) was an American politician, who served as the fifth governor of Pennsylvania from 1820 to 1823. He was a member of the Hiester family political dynasty, and was a member of the Democratic-Republican Party.

Biography
Hiester was the son of John Hiester and Maria Barbara Epler. He received a common-school education when he was not working on the farm, and became a clerk in a store in Reading run by Adam Whitman. He became a partner in the store in 1771 when he married Elizabeth, Whitman's daughter. He owned slaves.

At the beginning of the American Revolutionary War, he raised and equipped in that town a company with which he took part in the battles of Long Island and Germantown. He was then promoted to colonel. He was captured and briefly confined in the prison ship "Jersey," where he did much to alleviate the sufferings of his fellow prisoners.  Later he was transferred to New York City where he was exchanged.

He was a member of the convention of 1776 that drafted the Articles of Confederation, of the Pennsylvania state constitutional convention which ratified the United States Constitution, and of the state constitutional convention of 1790. He served in the Pennsylvania House of Representatives from 1787 to 1790 and the Pennsylvania Senate for the 17th district from 1790–1794.  In 1807, he was appointed one of the two major generals to command the quota of Pennsylvania militia that was called for by the president. He served in the United States House of Representatives from 1797 until 1805, and again from 1815 until 1820, 14 years altogether. In 1817, he ran for governor, and was defeated by William Findlay. Hiester faced Findlay again in 1820 and narrowly won a single term in office. Refusing on principle to stand for reelection in 1823, he served until 1824 when he retired from public life. During his term, he presided over the dedication of the first state capitol building in the new capital of Harrisburg. He surprised partisans and opponents by making appointments strictly on merit rather than party affiliation.

He was known by the nickname of "Old German Grey" and spoke with a Pennsylvania Dutch German accent.

Initially buried at Reading's Reformed Church cemetery after his death in 1832, his remains were exhumed and reinterred at the Charles Evans Cemetery during the mid-19th century.

Legacy
A residence hall on the Penn State University Park campus was named after him.

Notes

References

The Political Graveyard

External links

|-

|-

1752 births
1832 deaths
People from Berks County, Pennsylvania
People of colonial Pennsylvania
Hiester family
Pennsylvania Dutch people
Democratic-Republican Party members of the United States House of Representatives from Pennsylvania
Democratic-Republican Party state governors of the United States
Governors of Pennsylvania
Members of the Pennsylvania House of Representatives
Pennsylvania state senators
American slave owners
18th-century American politicians
19th-century American politicians
Pennsylvania militiamen in the American Revolution
Burials at Charles Evans Cemetery